Kalochori (Greek: Καλοχώρι) may refer to the following places in Greece:

Kalochori, Thessaloniki, a town in the Thessaloniki regional unit
Kalochori, Kastoria, a village in the Kastoria regional unit
Kalochori, Ioannina, a village in the Ioannina regional unit
Kalochori, Larissa, a village in the Larissa regional unit
Kalochori, Serres, a village in the Serres regional unit
Kalochori-Panteichi, a village in Euboea regional unit